Sir John Conroy, 3rd Baronet, FRS (16 August 1845 – 15 December 1900) was an English analytical chemist.

Conroy was born in Kensington, west London, the son of Sir Edward Conroy, 2nd Baronet (1809–1869) and Lady Alicia Conroy. He was descended from the Ó Maolconaire family of Elphin, County Roscommon. The family had been the hereditary Ollamhs to the O'Connor Kings of Connacht. He was descended from Maoilin Ó Maolchonaire who was the last recognised Chief of the Sept. He was educated at Eton College and then Christ Church, Oxford, also the college of his father, where he read Natural Science, gaining a first class degree in 1868. His tutor was the chemical kinetics pioneer Augustus George Vernon Harcourt FRS.

He lived mostly with his mother at Arborfield Grange in Berkshire until 1880. His scientific interests were in analytical chemistry, especially optical measurements. He worked mainly in a laboratory at Christ Church in Oxford. He had teaching posts at Keble College (1880–90), and Balliol College and Trinity College (1886–1900). He worked at the Balliol-Trinity Laboratories with Sir Harold Hartley and others.
In 1890, he became a Fellow of Balliol College. In 1891, he was elected a Fellow of the Royal Society.

Conroy's religious leanings were High Church and he was involved with the English Church Union. From 1897, he was treasurer of the Radcliffe Infirmary in Oxford.

Conroy never married and died in Rome.

References

1845 births
1900 deaths
People from Kensington
People educated at Eton College
Alumni of Christ Church, Oxford
Fellows of Balliol College, Oxford
English physical chemists
Analytical chemists
Conroy, John, 3rd Baronet
Fellows of the Royal Society